A depressant, or central depressant, is a drug that lowers neurotransmission levels, which is to depress or reduce arousal or stimulation, in various areas of the brain. Depressants are also colloquially referred to as downers as they lower the level of arousal when taken. Stimulants or "uppers" increase mental or physical function, hence the opposite drug class of depressants is stimulants, not antidepressants.

Depressants are widely used throughout the world as prescription medicines and as illicit substances. Alcohol is a very prominent depressant. Alcohol can be and is more likely to be a large problem among teenagers and young adults. When depressants are used, effects often include ataxia, anxiolysis, pain relief, sedation or somnolence, and cognitive or memory impairment, as well as in some instances, euphoria, dissociation, muscle relaxation, lowered blood pressure or heart rate, respiratory depression, and anticonvulsant effects. Depressants also act to produce anesthesia. Cannabis may sometimes be considered a depressant due to one of its components, cannabidiol. The latter is known to treat insomnia, anxiety and muscle spasms similar to other depressive drugs. However, tetrahydrocannabinol, another component, may slow brain function to a small degree while reducing reaction to stimuli, it is generally considered to be a stimulant and main psychoactive agent to sometimes cause anxiety, panic and psychosis instead. Other depressants can include drugs like Xanax (a benzodiazepine) and a number of opioids. Gabapentinoids like gabapentin and baclofen are depressants and have anticonvulsant and anxiolytic effects. Most anticonvulsants like Lamotrigine and Phenytoin are depressants. Carbamates (Felbamate Carisoprodol) are depressants that are similar to barbiturates.

Depressants exert their effects through a number of different pharmacological mechanisms, the most prominent of which include facilitation of GABA, and inhibition of glutamatergic or monoaminergic activity. Other examples are chemicals that modify the electrical signaling inside the body, the most prominent of these being bromides and channel blockers.

Indications 
Depressants are used medicinally to relieve the following symptoms:
 Anxiety disorders such as:
 Generalized anxiety
 Social anxiety
 Panic attacks
 Insomnia
 Obsessive–compulsive disorder
 Seizures
 Convulsions
 Depression
 Pain

Types

Alcohol 

An alcoholic beverage is a drink that contains alcohol (also known formally as ethanol), an anesthetic that has been used as a psychoactive drug for several millennia. Ethanol is the oldest recreational drug still used by humans. Ethanol can cause alcohol intoxication when consumed. Alcoholic beverages are divided into three general classes for taxation and regulation of production: beers, wines, and spirits (distilled beverages). They are legally consumed in most countries around the world. More than 100 countries have laws regulating their production, sale, and consumption.

The most common way to measure intoxication for legal or medical purposes is through blood alcohol content (also called blood alcohol concentration or blood alcohol level). It is usually expressed as a percentage of alcohol in the blood in units of mass of alcohol per volume of blood, or mass of alcohol per mass of blood, depending on the country. For instance, in North America a blood alcohol content of "0.10" or more correctly 0.10 g/dL means that there are 0.10 g of alcohol for every dL of blood (i.e., mass per volume is used there).

Barbiturates 

Barbiturates are effective in relieving the conditions that they are designed to address (insomnia, seizures). They are also commonly used for unapproved purposes, are physically addictive, and have serious potential for overdose. In the late 1950s, when many thought that the social cost of barbiturates was beginning to outweigh the medical benefits, a serious search began for a replacement drug. Most people still using barbiturates today do so in the prevention of seizures or in mild form for relief from the symptoms of migraines.

Benzodiazepines 

A benzodiazepine (sometimes colloquially "benzo"; often abbreviated "BZD") is a drug whose core chemical structure is the fusion of a benzene ring and a diazepine ring. The first such drug, chlordiazepoxide (Librium), was discovered accidentally by Leo Sternbach in 1955, and made available in 1960 by Hoffmann–La Roche, which has also marketed the benzodiazepine diazepam (Valium) since 1963.

Benzodiazepines enhance the effect of the neurotransmitter gamma-aminobutyric acid (GABA) at the GABAA receptor, resulting in sedative, hypnotic (sleep-inducing), anxiolytic (anti-anxiety), anticonvulsant, and muscle relaxant properties; also seen in the applied pharmacology of high doses of many shorter-acting benzodiazepines are amnesic-dissociative actions. These properties make benzodiazepines useful in treating anxiety, insomnia, agitation, seizures, muscle spasms, alcohol withdrawal and as a premedication for medical or dental procedures. Benzodiazepines are categorized as either short-, intermediate-, or long-acting. Short- and intermediate-acting benzodiazepines are preferred for the treatment of insomnia; longer-acting benzodiazepines are recommended for the treatment of anxiety.

In general, benzodiazepines are safe and effective in the short term, although cognitive impairments and paradoxical effects such as aggression or behavioral disinhibition occasionally occur. A minority react reverse and contrary to what would normally be expected. For example, a state of panic may worsen considerably following intake of a benzodiazepine. Long-term use is controversial due to concerns about adverse psychological and physical effects, increased questioning of effectiveness, and, because benzodiazepines are prone to cause tolerance, physical dependence, and, upon cessation of use after long-term use, benzodiazepine withdrawal syndrome. Due to adverse effects associated with the long-term use of benzodiazepines, withdrawal from benzodiazepines, in general, leads to improved physical and mental health. The elderly are at an increased risk of experiencing both short- and long-term adverse effects.

There is controversy concerning the safety of benzodiazepines in pregnancy. While they are not major teratogens, uncertainty remains as to whether they cause cleft palate in a small number of babies and whether neurobehavioural effects occur as a result of prenatal exposure; they are known to cause withdrawal symptoms in the newborn. Benzodiazepines can be taken in overdoses and can cause dangerous deep unconsciousness. However, they are much less toxic than their predecessors, the barbiturates, and death rarely results when a benzodiazepine is the only drug taken; however, when combined with other central nervous system depressants such as alcohol and opiates, the potential for toxicity and fatal overdose increases. Benzodiazepines are commonly misused and taken in combination with other addictive drugs. In addition, all benzodiazepines are listed in Beers List, which is significant in clinical practice.

Cannabis

Cannabis is often considered either in its own unique category or as a mild psychedelic. The chemical compound tetrahydrocannabinol (THC), which is found in cannabis, has many depressant effects such as muscle relaxation, sedation, decreased alertness, and less tiredness. Contrary to the previous statement, activation of the CB1 receptor by cannabinoids causes an inhibition of GABA, the exact opposite of what central nervous system depressants do.

Carbamates 

Carbamates are a class of depressants or "tranquilizers" that are synthesized from urea. Carbamates have anxiolytic, muscle relaxant, anticonvulsant, hypnotic, antihypertensive, and analgesic effects. It has other uses like muscle tremors, agitation, and alcohol withdrawal. Its muscle relaxant effects are useful for strains, sprains, and muscle injuries together with rest, physical therapy, and other measures. The effects, synthesis and mechanism of action of Carbamates are very similar to barbiturates. There are many different types of Carbamates, some only produce anxiolytic effects and hypnotic effects while some only have anticonvulsant effects.

Side effects of Carbamates include drowsiness, dizziness, headache, diarreha, nausea, flatulence, liver failure, poor coordination, nystagmus, abuse, dizziness, weakness, nervousness, euphoria, overstimulation and dependence. Uncommon but potentially severe adverse reactions include hyper sensivity reactions including Stevens Johnson syndrome, embryo-fetal toxicity, stupor, and coma. Carbamates are fatal in overdose, which is why a lot of them have been replaced with benzodiazepines. It is not recommended to use most Carbamates like Carisoprodol for a long time as physical and psychological dependence does occur.

Meprobamate which metabolizes to Carisoprodol was launched in 1955. It quickly become the first blockbuster psychotropic drug in America becoming popular in Hollywood and gaining fame for its seemingly miraculous effects. It has since been marketed under more than 100 trade names, from Amepromat through Quivet to Zirpon. Carisoprodol, which is still used today mainly for its muscle relaxant effects has high abuse potential. Its mechanism of action is very similar to barbiturates, alcohol, methaqualone  and benzodiazepines. Carsidoprodol allosterically modulates and directly activates the human α1β2γ2 GABAAR (GABAA) in the central nervous system in a barbiturate-like manner. This causes chloride channels to open, allowing chloride to flood into the neuron, slowing down communication between neurons; thus slowing down the nervous system. Unlike benzodiazpines which increase the frequency of the chloride channel opening, Carisoprodol increase the duration of channel opening when GABA is bound. GABA is the main inhibitory neurotransmitter in the nervous system, which causes its depressant effects.

Carbamates are fatal in overdose. Symptoms are similar to a barbiturate overdose. Symptoms typically include difficulty thinking, poor coordination, decreased level of consciousness, and a decreased effort to breathe (respiratory depression). An overdose is more likely to be fatal when it is mixed with another depressant that suppresses breathing. Death occurs this is typically due to a lack of breathing.

Physical and psychological dependence does happen with long term use of Carbamates; particularly Carisoprodol. Today Carisoprodol is only used short term for muscle pain, particularly back pain. Discontinuation after long term use could be very intense and even possibly fatal. Withdrawal can resemble barbiturate, alcohol, or benzodiazepine withdrawal, as they all have a similar mechanism of action. Discontinuation symptoms include, confusion, disorientation, delirium, hallucinations (auditory & visual), insomnia, decreased appetite, anxiety, psychomotor agitation, pressured speech, tremor, tachycardia, seizures which could be fatal.

Carbamates were popular in the 1950s along with barbiturates. Although they have been slowly phased out; mainly due to the overdose and dependence risks, new derivates still exist. Felbamate is an anticonvulsant that was approved in 1993 that is commonly used today. It is a GABAA positive allosteric modulator and blocks the NR2B subunit of the NMDA receptor. Some carbamates block sodium channels.  Phenprobamate was used as an anxiolytic and is still sometimes used in Europe for general anesthesia and for treating muscle cramps and spasticity. Methocarbamol is a popular drug that is commonly known as Robaxin, that is over the counter in some countries.. It is a carbamate with muscle relaxant effects. Tetrabamate; a is a controversial drug which is a combination of febarbamate, difebarbamate, and phenobarbital which is marketed in Europe was largely but not completely discontinued. April 4, 1997 after over 30 years of use due to reports of hepatitis and acute liver failure. The decision to restrict the use of the drug had been long-awaited. Carisoprodol; known as, "Soma" is still commonly used today for its muscle relaxant effects. It is also very commonly abused around the world. It is a Schedule IV substance in the United States. Famous martial artist and actor Bruce Lee died due to an allergic reaction to meprobamate.

Approved
 Carisoprodol/Meprobamate/Tybamate (Soma/Miltown, Solacen) (muscle relaxant, anxiolytic, tranquilizer)
 Difebarbamate (Atrium, Sevrium) (tranquilizer)
 Emylcamate (Striatran) (anxiolytic and muscle relaxant)
 Ethinamate (Valamin, Valmid) (sedative-hypnotic)
 Febarbamate/Phenobamate (Solium, Tymium) (anxiolytic and tranquilizer)
 Felbamate (Felbatol) (anticonvulsant)
 Hexapropymate (Merinax)  (hypnotic-sedative)
 Mebutamate (Capla, Dormate) (anxiolytic, sedative, antihypertensive)
 Phenprobamate (Gamaquil, Isotonil) (muscle relaxant, sedative, anxiolytic, anticonvulsant, anesthesia)
 Procymate (Equipax) (sedative, anxiolytic)
 Styramate (Sinaxamol) (muscle relaxant, anticonvulsant)
 Tetrabamate (febarbamate, difebarbamate, phenobarbital) (Atrium, G Tril, Sevrium) (anxiety, alcohol withdrawal, muscle tremors, agitation, depression)

Although a drug may be approved, it does not necessarily mean it is still used today.

Not approved

 Carisbamate (anticonvulsant)
 Clocental (hypnotic)
 Cyclarbamate (muscle relaxant and tranquilizer)
 Lorbamate (muscle relaxant and tranquilizer)
 Nisobamate (tranquilizer)
 Pentabamate (tranquilizer)

Gabapentinoids

Gabapentinoids are a unique and relatively novel class of depressants that selectively bind to the auxiliary α2δ subunit (CACNA2D1) and (CACNA2D2), site of certain VDCCs, and thereby act as inhibitors of α2δ subunit-containing Voltage-gated calcium channels. α2δ  is nicknamed the "Gabapentin receptor".  At physiologic or resting membrane potential, VDCCs are normally closed. They are activated (opened) at depolarized membrane potentials and this is the source of the "voltage-gated" epithet. Gabapentinoids bind to the α1 and α2 sites of the α2δ subunit family. Gabapentin is the prototypical gabapentinoid. The α2δ is found on L-type calcium channels, N-type calcium channels, P/Q-type calcium channels, and R-type calcium channels throughout the central and peripheral nervous systems. α2δ is located on presynaptic neurons and affects calcium channel trafficking and kinetics, initiates extracellular signaling cascades, gene expression and promotes excitatory synaptogenesis through thrombospondin 1 . Gabapentinoids are not direct channel blockers, instead they disrupt the regulatory function of α2δ and its interactions with other proteins. Most of the effects of gabapentinoids are mediated by the high voltage activated N and P/Q-type calcium channels. P/Q-type calcium channels are mainly found in the cerebellum (Purkinje neurons) which made be responsible for the ataxic adverse effect of gabapentinoids, while N-type calcium channels are located throughout the central and peripheral nervous systems. N-type calcium channels are mainly responsible for the analgesic effects of gabapentinoids. Ziconotide, a non-gabapentinoid ω-conotoxin peptide binds to the N-type calcium channels and has analgesic effects 1000 times stronger than morphine. Gabapentinoids are selective for the α2δ site, but non-selective when they bind to the calcium channels complex. They act on the α2δ site to lower the release of many excitatory and pro-nociceptive neurochemicals including glutamate, substance P, calcitonin gene-related peptide (CGRP) and more.

Gabapentinoids are absorbed from the intestines mainly by the Large neutral amino acid transporter 1 (LAT1, SLC7A5) and the Excitatory amino acid transporter 3 (EAAT3). They are one of the few drugs that use these amino acid transporters. Gabapentinoids are structurally similar to the Branched-chained amino acids L-leucine, and L-isoleucine, both of which also bind to the α2δ site. Branched-chained amino acids like l-leucine, l-isoleucine, and l-valine have many functions in the central nervous system. They modify large neutral amino acid (LNAA) transport at the blood–brain barrier, and reduce the synthesis neurotransmitter of neurotransmitters derived from aromatic-amino acids notably serotonin from tryptophan, and catecholamines from tyrosine and phenylalanine. This may be relevant to the pharmacology of gabapentinoids.

Gabapentin was designed by researchers at Parke-Davis to be an analogue of the neurotransmitter GABA that could more easily cross the blood–brain barrier and was first described in 1975 by Satzinger and Hartenstein. Gabapentin was first approved for epilepsy, mainly as an add-on treatment to partial seizures. Gabapentinoids are GABA analogues, but they do not bind to the GABA receptors, do not convert into  or another GABA receptor agonist in vivo, and do not directly modulate GABA transport or metabolism.  Phenibut and baclofen, two structurally related compounds are exceptions as they mainly act on the GABA B receptor.  Also, gabapentin, but not pregabalin, has been found to activate Kvvoltage-gated potassium channels (KCNQ), which might potentiate it's depressant qualities. Despite this, gabapentinoids mimic GABA activity by inhibiting neurotransmission. Gabapentinoids prevent delivery of the calcium channels to the cell membrane, and disrupt interactions of α2δ with NMDA receptors, AMPA receptors, neurexins, and thrombospondins. Some calcium channel blockers of the dihydropyridine class used for hypertension weakly block α2δ.

Gabapentinoids have anxiolytic, anticonvulsant, antiallodynic, antinociceptive and possibly muscle relaxant properties. Pregabalin and gabapentin are used in epilepsy, mainly partial seizures (focal). Gabapentinoids are not effective for generalized seizures. They are also used for postherpetic neuralgia, neuropathic pain associated with diabetic neuropathy, fibromyalgia, generalized anxiety disorder, and restless legs syndrome. Pregabalin and gabapentin have many off-label uses including insomnia, Alcohol and opioid withdrawal, smoking cessation, social anxiety disorder, bipolar disorder, attention deficit hyperactivity disorder, chronic pain, hot flashes, tinnutus, migraines and more. Baclofen is primarily used for the treatment of spastic movement disorders, especially in instances of spinal cord injury, cerebral palsy, and multiple sclerosis. Phenibut is used in Russia, Ukraine, Belarus and Latvia to treat anxiety and to improve sleep, as in the treatment of insomnia. It is also used for various other indications, including the treatment of asthenia, depression, alcoholism, alcohol withdrawal syndrome, post-traumatic stress disorder, stuttering, tics, vestibular disorders, Ménière's disease, dizziness, for the prevention of motion sickness, and for the prevention of anxiety before or after surgical procedures or painful diagnostic tests. Phenibut, like other GABA B agonists, is also sometimes used by body builders to increase human growth hormone.

Reuters reported on 25 March 2010, that "Pfizer Inc violated a United States racketeering law by improperly promoting the epilepsy drug Neurontin (gabapentin). Under the Racketeer Influenced and Corrupt Organizations Act the penalty is automatically tripled, so the finding will cost Pfizer $141 million." The case stems from a claim from Kaiser Foundation Health Plan Inc. that "it was misled into believing Neurontin was effective for off-label treatment of migraines, bipolar disorder and other conditions. Pfizer argued that Kaiser physicians still recommend the drug for those uses", and that "the insurer's website also still lists Neurontin as a drug for neuropathic pain."

In some cases, gabapentinoids are abused and provide similar effects to alcohol, benzodiazepines and gamma-hydroxybutyric acid (GHB). The FDA placed a black box warning on Neurontin (gabapentin), and Lyrica (pregabalin), for serious breathing problems. Mixing gabapentinoids with opioids, benzodiazepines, barbiturates, GHB, alcohol, or any other depressant is potentially deadly.

Common side effects of gabapentinoids include drowsiness, dizziness, weakness, increased appetite, urinary retention, shortness of breath, involuntary eye movements (nystagmus), memory issues, uncontrollable jerking motions, auditory hallucinations, erectile dysfunction, and myoclonic seizures.

An overdose of gabapentinoids usually consists of severe drowsiness, severe ataxia, blurred vision, slurred speech, severe uncontrollable jerking motions, and anxiety. Like most anticonvulsants, pregabalin and gabapentin have an increased risk of suicidal thoughts and behaviors. Gabapentinoids, like all calcium channel blockers are known to cause angioedema. Taking them with an ACE inhibitor can increase the toxic effects of Gabapentinoids. They may also enhance the fluid-retaining effect of certain anti-diabetic agents (thiazolidinediones). It is not known if they cause gingival enlargement like other calcium channel blockers. Gabapentinoids are excreted by the kidney mostly in their original form. Gabapentinoids can build up in the body when someone has renal failure. This usually presents itself as myoclonus, and an altered mental state. It is unclear if it is safe to use Gabapentinoids during pregnancy with some studies showing potential harm.

Physical or physiological dependence does occur during long-term use of gabapentinoids. Following abrupt or rapid discontinuation of pregabalin and gabapentin people report withdrawal symptoms like insomnia, headache, nausea, diarrhea, flu-like symptoms, anxiety, depression, pain, hyperhidrosis, seizures, psychomotor agitation, confusion, disorientation, and gastrointestinal complaints. Acute withdrawal from baclofen and phenibut may also cause auditory and visual hallucinations, and acute psychosis. Baclofen withdrawal can be more intense if it is administered intrathecally or for long periods of time. If Baclofen or Phenibut is used for long periods of time it can resemble intense benzodiazepine, GHB or alcohol withdrawal. To minimize withdrawal symptoms Baclofen or Phenibut should be tapered down slowly. Abrupt withdrawal from Phenibut or Baclofen could be possibly be life-threatening, because of its mechanism of action. Abrupt withdrawal can cause rebound seizures and severe agitation.

 Gabapentin (Neurontin)
 Gabapentin Enacarbil (Horizant, Regnite)
 Gabapentin Extended-Release (Gralise)
 Pregabalin (Lyrica)
 Phenibut (Anvifen, Fenibut, Noofen)
 Baclofen (Lioresal)
 Mirogabalin (Tarlige) (Japan Only)
Not approved:

Imagabalin
 Tolibut
 4-Flurophenibut
 HSK16149
 Trans-4 and cis-4-[18F] fluorogabapentin (α2δ PET Imaging)
 4-Methylpregabalin
 PD-217,014
 Atagabalin
 Arbaclofen
 Saclofen
Endogenous (Not Gabapentinoids, endogenous BCAA amino acids that bind to α2δ:

 Calcium
 Isoleucine
 Leucine
 Valine
 Aspartate

Other α2δ ligands:

 Phenylalanine
 NP-118809
 Gababutin
 Ziconotide (Approved for pain)
 Ethanol 
 Dextrothyroxine (Agonist of α2δ instead of inhibiting it)
 Ethioninie
 Suloctidil
 Terodiline
 Bepridil

gamma-Hydroxybutyric acid 

gamma-Hydroxybutyric acid or "GHB" is a natural occurring neurotransmitter and depressant drug. It is the prototypical substance among a couple of GHB receptor modulators.

Opioids/Opiates

Opioids are substances that act on opioid receptors to reduce pain. Medically they are primarily used for pain relief, including anesthesia. Opioids also cause euphoria and are highly abused.

Opioids and Opiates are not the same. Opiates refer to natural opioids such as morphine and codeine. Opioids refer to all natural, semisynthetic, and synthetic opioids, like heroin and oxycodone.

Contrary to popular misconception, opioids are not depressants in the classical sense. They do produce central nervous system depression, however, they also excite certain areas of the central nervous system. To remain true to the term 'depressant' – opioids cannot be classified as such. For opioid agonists and opium derivatives, these are classified differently. analgesic or narcotic correctly identifies these drugs. However, they do have depressant actions nonetheless.

There are three principal classes of opioid receptors, μ, κ, δ (mu, kappa, and delta), although up to seventeen have been reported, and include the ε, ι, λ, and ζ (Epsilon, Iota, Lambda and Zeta) receptors. Conversely, σ (Sigma) receptors are no longer considered to be opioid receptors because their activation is not reversed by the opioid inverse-agonist naloxone.The nociception opioid peptide receptor (NOP) (ORL1) is an opioid receptor which is involved in pain responses, anxiety, movement, reward, hunger, memory and much more. It plays a major role in the development of tolerance to μ-opioid agonists.

When "pain" occurs, a signal gets sent from the site of possible injury. This signal goes up the spinal cord into the brain where it is perceived as a negative emotion known as nociception or "hurt". In the central nervous system the spine is connected to the brain by a structure called the brain stem. The brain stem is the first part of the brain that develops in a mammal out of the neural crest. It is also the oldest part of the brain and controls many automatic functions from consciousness, breathing, heart rate, digestion, and many more. Opioid receptors are specialized pain blocking receptors. They bind a wide range of hormones, peptides, and much more. Although they are found everywhere in the central nervous system they are highly concentrated in the brain stem. Depending on the receptor, activation of them has the ability to stop pain from making up to the brain, and being perceived as pain. Hence opioids do not actually "stop" pain, they simply stop you from knowing you are in pain. Pain and the ability to modify it based on an organisms environment is an evolutionary advantage, and it has been shown that it can help an organism escape and survive certain situations where they may otherwise be immobilized due to pain and injury. The midbrain nuclei of the brain stem with its structures like the periaqueductal gray, reticular formation, and rostromedial tegmental nucleus are responsible for the majority of the physical and psychological effects of endogenous and exogenous opioids. 

The μ-opioid receptor is the responsible for the analgesic, euphoric, and adverse effects of opioids. The μ-opioid receptor is a G-protein coupled receptor. When the μ-opioid receptor is activated it causes pain relief, euphoria, constipation, constricted pupils, itching, and nausea. The μ-opioid is located in the gastrointestinal tract which controls peristalsis. This causes constipation which can be extremely problematic and distressing. Activation of this receptor also causes relaxation of voluntary and involuntary muscles which can cause side effects like trouble urinating and swallowing. The μ-opioid receptor can also reduce androgens, thus decreasing libido and sexual function. The μ-opioid receptor has many endogenous ligands including endorphin.

The Kappa receptor (KOR) is a G protein-coupled receptor located in the central nervous system. KOR is also a G-protein coupled receptor. Humans and some other primates have a higher density of kappa receptors than most other animals. KOR is responsible for nociception, consciousness, motor control, and mood. Dysregulation of this receptor system has been implicated in alcohol and drug addiction. The endogenous ligand for KOR is dynorphin. Activation of KOR usually causes dysphoria; hence the name dynorphin. The intoxicating plant, Salvia divinorum contains salvinorin A, an alkaloid that is a potent and selective κ-opioid (kappa-opioid) receptor agonist This cause powerful hallucinations. Antagonizing the κ-opioid (kappa-opioid) receptor may be able to treat depression, anxiety, stress, addiction and alcoholism.

The third receptor is the δ-opioid receptor (DOR). The delta receptor is the least studied out of the 3 main opioid receptors. It is a G-protein coupled receptor, and its endogenous ligand is deltorphin. Activation of δ-opioid receptor (DOR) may have antidepressant effects. δ-opioid agonists can produce respiratory depression at very high doses, at lower doses they have the opposite effect. High doses of an δ-opioid agonist can cause seizures, although not all delta agonists produce this effect. Activation of the delta receptor is usually stimulating instead of sedating like most opioids.

The nociception receptor (nociception opioid peptide receptor (NOP) is involved in the regulation of numerous brain activities, particularly instinctive, emotional behaviors, and pain. (NOP) is a G-protein coupled receptor. The nociception receptor controls a wide range of biological functions ranging from nociception to food intake, memory processes to cardiovascular and renal functions, from spontaneous locomotor activity to gastrointestinal motility, to anxiety and the control of neurotransmitter release at peripheral and central sites.

An opioid overdose is fatal. Usually a person overdosing an opioids/opiates presents with respiratory depression, a lethal condition that can cause hypoxia from slow and shallow breathing. Mixing opioids with another depressant such as benzodiazepines or alcohol increases the chance of an overdose and raspatory depression. Opioid overdose causes a decreased level of consciousness, pinpoint pupils and respiratory depression. Other symptoms include seizures and muscle spasms. Opioids activate μ-opioid receptors in specific regions of the central nervous system associated with respiratory regulation. They activate μ-opioid receptors in the medulla and pons. They are located in the brain stem connecting to the spine. This area has a high density of μ-opioid receptors as they block pain going up from spine into the brain. These areas are the oldest and most primitive parts of the brain. They control automatic functions such as breathing and digestion. Opioids stop this process and cause respiratory depression and constipation. The brain stem no longer detects carbon dioxide in the blood, so it does not initiate the inhalation reflex, usually resulting in hypoxia, although some overdose victims die from cardiovascular failure, or asphyxiation from choking on their vomit.

Naloxone, is a  μ-opioid receptor antagonist. Meaning instead of activating the μ-opioid receptor it disrupts the functioning of the receptor. Since Naloxone is powerful and highly selective for the μ-opioid receptor it can knock off powerful opioids like fentanyl right off the receptor and blocking another ligand to bind to the receptor, thus stopping an overdose. A person dependent on opioids may go into precipitated withdrawal when Naloxone is used. Since naloxone blocks any endogenous or exogenous opioids from binding to the μ-opioid receptor. This may cause a person to immediately go into withdrawal after naloxone is used. This can cause withdrawal symptoms like cold sweats and diarrhea.

Opioids activate μ-opioid receptors in the rostromedial tegmental nucleus (RMTg). The Rostromedial tegmental nucleus is a GABAergic nucleus which functions as a "master brake" for the midbrain dopamine system. The RMTg possesses robust functional and structural links to the dopamine pathways. Opioids decrease the release of GABA, thus disinhibiting the GABAergic brake on dopamine networks. GABA is an inhibitory neurotransmitter meaning it either blocks or decreases the potential of a neuron firing. This causes large amounts of dopamine to be released, as it isn't blocked by GABA anymore. Disinhibition of GABA may be responsible for causing seizures, an uncommon adverse effect of opioids. The GABAergic disinhibition is also the why Opioids aren't considered true "depressants". This exciting of dopaminergic pathways causes the euphoria of opioids. This causes major positive reinforcing effects in the brain, instructing it to do it again. The RMTg is also responsible for development of tolerance and addiction. Psychostimulants also excite this pathway.

Fentanyl is very commonly cut into other substances sold on the street. Fentanyl is used to increase the potency of substances, thus making the user spend more money on the laced substance. Sometimes substances can be laced with Carfentanil. Carfentail is an ultrapotent and highly selective agonist of the μ-opioid receptor. Carfentanil is used to anesthetize large animals such as elephants and rhinoceroses as a tranquilizer dart. Carfentanil has approximately 10,000 times the analgesic potency of morphine, 4,000 times the potency of heroin, and 20 to 100 times the potency of fentanyl. It's very easy to overdose on these substances, especially if you have no tolerance. It is recommended to get your drugs tested, and to carry Naloxone.

Natural Opiates (Papaver somniferum, Opium)
 Morphine (MS Contin)
 Codeine (Tylenol No. 3)
 Papaverine (Pavabid)
 Noscapine (Narcotine)
 Thebaine
 Oripavine
 Narceine

Semi-synthetic Morphinan Opioids:
 Oxycodone (OxyContin)
 Heroin (Diamorphine)
 Hydrocodone (Vicodin)
 Oxymorphone (Opana)
 Hydromorphone (Dilaudid)
 Buprenorphine (Suboxone)
 Naloxone (Narcan)
Semi-synthetic Opioids are derived from the natural alkaloid thebaine.

Fully synthetic Opioids:
 Fentanyl (Duragesic)
 Tramadol (Ultram)
 Methadone (Dolophine)
 Pethidine (Demerol)
 Ketobemidone (Ketogan)
 Pentazocine (Talwin)
 Carfentanil (Wildnil)
 Loperamide (Imodium)
 Dextropropoxyphene (Darvocet)
 Tapentadol (Nucynta)
 Dextropropoxyphene (Darvocet)
Others: 

Mitragyna speciosa (Kratom) Indole alkaloid''

Piperidinediones 

Piperidinediones are a class of depressants that are not used anymore. There are Piperidinediones that are used for other purposes like breast cancer. . The Piperidinedione class is very structurally similar to barbiturates. Piperidinediones inclide Glutethimide, Methyprylon, Pyrithyldione, Glutarimide, and Aminoglutethimide. The first 3, (Glutethimide, Methyprylon, Pyrithyldione) are central nervous depressants. The Piperidinedione depressants, specifically Glutethimide is a positive modulator of the GABAA anion channel. The drug increases inhibitory GABAergic tone and causes neuro-inhibition of the cortical and limbic systems, observed clinically as a sedative-hypnotic effect. Glutethimide is also a potent inhibitor of the CYP 2D6 enzyme in the liver. This enzyme is responsible for converting many drugs from beta blockers to antidepressants to opioids and opiates. Due to its effects on the conversion of opioids, it was highly abused and mixed with opioids like codeine. Codeine needs to get metabolized to morphine in the liver to have its psychoactive and analgesic effects. Mixing codeine with the Piperidinedione Glutethimide allowed more codeine to be converted into morphine in the body; this increasing its effect. This was known as "hits", "cibas and codeine", "Dors and 4s". Glutethimide was believed to be safer than barbiturates, but many people died from the drug. Demand was high in the United States at one point. Production of glutethimide was discontinued in the US in 1993 and in several eastern European countries, most notably Hungary, in 2006.

Glutethimide withdrawal is intense and resembles barbiturate withdrawal. It features hallucinations and delirium; typical of a depressant withdrawal. In the 1970s, there were reports of neonatal withdrawal from glutethimide. Infants born to mothers addicted to glutethimide responded well initially, then had recurrence of symptoms about 5 days later, including overactivity, restlessness, tremors, hyperreflexia, hypotonus, vasomotor instability, incessant crying, and general irritability.

Glutethimide withdrawal featured severe agitation, tremor and seizures which could be fatal.

Overdose causes stupor or coma and respiratory depression.

 Methyprylon (Dimerin, Methyprylone, Noctan, Noludar) 
 Pyrithyldione (Presidon, Pyridion, Pyridione, Pyrithyldion, Pyrithyldione) 
 Piperidione (Ascron, Dihyprylon, Dihyprylone, Sedulon, Tusseval) (Withdrawan before approval)
 Glutethimide (Doriden)

Quinazolinone 

Quinazolinones are a class of depressants that are rarely used anymore. Quinazolinone have powerful sedative, hypnotic, and anxiolytic effects. Quinazolinones structures are very similar to some antibiotics. Quinazolines main mechanism of action is binding to the GABAA receptor. It does not bind to the ethanol, barbiturate, neurosteroid, or benzodiazepine site. Instead it binds on a site right between the GABRB2 (β2) and (α1) GABRA1 proteins on the GABAA receptor. The anesthetic etomidate and Anticonvulsant loreclezole may also bind to this site.

Overdose on Quinazolinone sometimes causes effects that are the opposite of Quinazolinone like sedation. Overdose consists of hyperreflexia, vomiting, kidney failure, delirium, hypertonia, coma, myoclonic twitches, somnolence, euphoria, muscular hyperactivity, agitated delirium, tachycardia, and tonic-clonic seizures. In 1982 2,764 people visited US emergency rooms from overdosing on Quinazolinones, specifically Methaqualone. Mixing Quinazolines with another depressant is possibly fatal. Death from a Quinazolinone overdose is usually caused by death through cardiac or respiratory arrest. Overdose resembles barbiturate/carbamate overdose.

Quinazolinones withdrawal occurs when someone has become dependent on a quinazolinone substance and stops using them. Quinazolinone withdrawal resembles ethanol, barbiturate, benzodiazepine and carbamate withdrawal. It usually consists of restlessness, nausea and vomiting, decreased appetite, tachycardia, insomnia, tremor, hallucinations, delirium, confusion, seizures; which could cause death, EEG photoparoxysmal response, myoclonic twitches, fever, muscle spasms, and irritability.

Methaqualone hydrochloride, a Quinazolinone anxiolytic and hypnotic is referred to as "quaaludes" "ludes" and "disco biscuits". Methaqualone was very commonly abused in the western world during the 1960s and 1970s. Methaqualone was mainly prescribed for insomnia as it was thought to be safer than barbiturates and carbamates. Methaqualone became highly abused by people and celebrities after its introduction in 1965. Methaqualone was first synthesized in India in 1951 by Indra Kishore Kacker and Syed Husain Zaheer, who were conducting research on finding new antimalarial medications. The drug name "Quaalude" (Methaqualone) is a portmanteau, combining the words "quiet interlude". Methaqualone was discontinued in the United States in 1985, mainly due to its psychological addictiveness, widespread abuse, and illegal recreational use. Non-benzodiazepines, and benzodiazepines are now uses to treat insomnia instead. Methaqualone is now a schedule I substance. Some quinazolinone analogues are still sold online. They come with risks of seizures.

Large doses of Methaqualone cause euphoria, disinhibition, increased sexuality, sociability, muscle relaxation, anxiolysis, and sedation. Today Methaqualone is widely abused in South Africa. Many celebrities have used Quinazolinone; specifically Methaqualone. Bill Cosby admitted to casual sex involving recreational use of Methaqualone (Quaaludes). 18 year old actor Anissa Jones died at 18 from an overdose of cocaine, PCP, Methaqualone, and the barbiturate Seconal. Billy Murcia a drummer for the rock band New York Dolls died at 21 when he drowned in a bathtub while overdosing on heroin and Methaqualone.

Cloroqualone was a Quinazolinone that binded to the GABAA and sigma-1 receptor. It had useful cough suppressant effects and weaker sedative effects than Methaqualone. But it was withdrawan due to its potential for abuse and overdose.

Diproqualone is a Quinazolinone that is still used today. Diproqualone has sedative, anxiolytic, antihistamine and analgesic properties, resulting from its agonist activity at the β subtype of the GABAa receptor, antagonist activity at all histamine receptors, inhibition of the cyclooxygenase-1 enzyme, and possibly its agonist activity at both the sigma-1 receptor and sigma-2 receptor. Diproqualone is used primarily for the treatment of inflammatory pain associated with osteoarthritis and rheumatoid arthritis, and more rarely for treating insomnia, anxiety and neuralgia. Diproqualone is the only analogue of methaqualone that is still in widespread clinical use, due to its useful anti-inflammatory and analgesic effects in addition to the sedative and anxiolytic actions common to other drugs of this class. There are still some concerns about the potential of diproqualone for abuse and overdose, and so it is not sold as a pure drug but only as the camphosulfonate salt in combination mixtures with other medicines such as ethenzamide.

Etaqualone is a quinazolinone-class depressant. It has sedative, hypnotic, muscle relaxant and central nervous system depressant properties. It was highly abused, and had high risk for overdose. Users would snort or smoke the free base Etaqualone hydrochloride salt.

Methylmethaqualone is an analogue of Methaqualone with similar hypnotic and sedative effects. Methylmethaqualone differs from methaqualone by 4-methylation on the phenyl ring. It produces convulsions at only slightly above the effective sedative dose. It would appear that this compound was sold on the black market in Germany as a designer drug analogue of methaqualone.

Nitromethaqualone is a quinazolinone depressant with 10x more powerful hypnotic and sedative effects than Methaqualone.

Quinazolinone's:

 Alfoqualone (Arofuto)
 Cloroqualone
 Diproqualone
 Etaqualone (Aolan, Athinazone, Ethinazone)
 Mebroqualone (MBQ)
 Mecloqualone (Nubarene, Casfen)
 Methaqualone (Quaalude, Sopor, Mandrax)
 Methylmethaqualone
 Nitromethaqualone
 SL-164 (Dicloqualone, DCQ)

Miscellaneous 
 Alpha and beta blockers (carvedilol, propranolol, atenolol, etc.)
 Anticholinergics (atropine, hyoscyamine, scopolamine, etc.)
 Anticonvulsants (topiramate, carbamazepine, lamotrigine, etc.)
 Antihistamines (diphenhydramine, doxylamine, promethazine, etc.)
 Antipsychotics (haloperidol, chlorpromazine, clozapine, etc.)
 Hypnotics (zolpidem, zopiclone, chloral hydrate, eszopiclone, etc.)
 Muscle relaxants (baclofen, phenibut, carisoprodol, cyclobenzaprine, etc.)
 Sedatives (gamma-hydroxybutyrate, etc.)

Methods of intake 
Combining multiple depressants can be very dangerous because the central nervous system's depressive properties have been proposed to increase exponentially instead of linearly. This characteristic makes depressants a common choice for deliberate overdoses in the case of suicide. The use of alcohol or benzodiazepines along with the usual dose of heroin is often the cause of overdose deaths in opiate addicts.

See also 
 Central nervous system depression
 Inhalant

References

External links 
 Painfully Obvious – A Community Resource
 Fact sheets and Harm Reduction Strategies About Depressants and Other Recreational Drugs
 U.S. Department of Human and Health Services: Drug Categories for Substances of Abuse
 About Psychotropic Medications: Quick Reference to Medications Used in Mental Health 
 National Institute on Drug Abuse: "NIDA for Teens: Prescription Depressant Medications".

Psychoactive drugs
Drugs acting on the nervous system
Health effects of alcohol